Tallys Machado de Oliveira, or simply Tallys, (October 26, 1987 – November 4, 2017) was a Brazilian attacking midfielder. He played for Paysandu of the Campeonato Brasileiro Série B until his death in 2017.

Tallys died in a traffic collision on 4 November 2017 in Garopaba.

References

External links
 CBF
 ipatingafc

1987 births
2017 deaths
Brazilian footballers
Grêmio Foot-Ball Porto Alegrense players
Cruzeiro Esporte Clube players
Ipatinga Futebol Clube players
Road incident deaths in Brazil
Sociedade Esportiva e Recreativa Caxias do Sul players
Paysandu Sport Club players
Brasiliense Futebol Clube players
Sociedade Esportiva do Gama players
Association football midfielders
Footballers from Porto Alegre